Robert M. Johnson is an American politician. He served on the Seattle City Council representing the fourth district, covering northeast Seattle and the area around the University of Washington, from 2016 until his resignation in April 2019.

In 2015, Johnson was elected to the city council after defeating Michael Maddux by a 708-vote margin in the nonpartisan general election. Johnson and Maddux had previously defeated 12-year incumbent Jean Godden in the August primary election. Both Johnson and Maddux ran as progressive urbanists (favoring denser city planning rather than urban or suburban sprawl), defeating slow-growth candidates Godden and Tony Provine. Prior to the election, Johnson was executive director of Transportation Choices Coalition, an advocacy group in Washington state, where he managed their campaign for the Sound Transit 2 rail expansion programs. Johnson was sworn into office on January 4, 2016. Several days later, he was appointed to the Sound Transit board of directors by King County Executive Dow Constantine, replacing fellow councilmember Mike O'Brien. He stated that he would work to make Seattle more affordable, and to implement more transportation and education options. In November 2018, he announced he would not seek a second city council term. Shortly after the announcement, he was offered a position as transportation adviser to the NHL Seattle project.

In late March 2019, Johnson announced he would vacate his council seat on April 5, 2019. After his resignation, an interim council member was appointed to take Johnson's place until the November 2019 election.

Johnson's family has lived in Seattle for five generations. He lives in the Ravenna neighborhood with his wife, Katie, and their three daughters.

Electoral history

References

External links 
 Webpage on Seattle City Council website

Living people
Seattle City Council members
21st-century American politicians
Year of birth missing (living people)